William de Taunton was a medieval Bishop of Winchester elect.

Life

Taunton was a monk of Winchester Cathedral before becoming Prior of Winchester in 1250. He was expelled from the office of prior in 1255 by Aymer de Valence, Bishop of Winchester and replaced by Andrew of London. However, he was named abbot of Milton Abbey before 6 December 1256. In 1261, he received a majority of the votes of the chapter of Winchester in an election to become Bishop of Winchester, but a minority selected Andrew of London and both men appealed to Pope Alexander IV and Pope Urban IV. Urban quashed the elections of both men sometime before 22 June 1262. William, however, received a dispensation for illegitimacy from the pope on 6 July 1262.

Citations

References
 British History Online Bishops of Winchester accessed on 2 November 2007
 British History Online Priors of Winchester accessed on 2 November 2007

Bishops of Winchester
13th-century English Roman Catholic bishops